Malaikottai Vaaliban is an upcoming Indian Malayalam-language period action drama film co-produced and directed by Lijo Jose Pellissery and written by P. S. Rafeeque. It was produced by Shibu Baby John for his maiden production house John & Mary Creative, along with Century Films, Maxlab Cinemas and Entertainments, and Amen Movie Monastery. The film stars Mohanlal in the lead role. The music was composed by Prashant Pillai.

Principal photography began on 18 January 2023 in Jaisalmer, Rajasthan.

Premise
The story is about an undefeated wrestler during Pre-Independence India.

Cast

Production

Development
The film was first announced by the makers on 25 October 2022 as the maiden production of former minister and politician Shibu Baby John's newly launched production house John & Mary Creative, bringing together director Lijo Jose Pellissery and actor Mohanlal for the first time. Its title was announced on 22 December that year. It was reported to be a period drama and Mohanlal plays a wrestler, as per media. The film is produced along with Century Films, Maxlab Cinemas and Entertainments, and Amen Movie Monastery. The screenplay was written by P. S. Rafeeque. Pellissery retained most of the technical crew from his previous films. Tinu Pappachan was attached as the associate director.

Casting
In November 2022, the team was reportedly in talks with Bollywood actress Radhika Apte for the female lead role. Names of other Bollywood actors Vidyut Jammwal and Rajpal Yadav also surfaced in relation to casting. Kannada actor and comedian Danish Sait confirmed in December that he will be debuting in Malayalam cinema with the film. He grew beard for the role who otherwise spots clean-shaven look. Marathi actress Sonalee Kulkarni debuts in Malayalam cinema with the film. She described the film as "musical period drama". In January 2023, it was reported that talks were going on with Tamil actors Kamal Haasan and Jiiva for two brief roles. Responding to his casting rumours, Kannada actor Rishab Shetty clarified that he was indeed approached for a role but rejected it for doing a Kannada film instead. Reportedly, Haasan also declined the role to rather focus on the works of Indian 2.

Filming
Production began with a customary pooja function on 18 January 2023 in Jaisalmer, Rajasthan. Madhu Neelakandan was the cinematographer. Most of filming takes place in Rajasthan. Shooting there is scheduled to last for about three months.

References

External links
 

Upcoming Indian films
Sport wrestling films
Films shot in Rajasthan
Films directed by Lijo Jose Pellissery